Champions is an Indian Tamil talent show on Sun TV. The show premiered on 10 November 2013. It airs  every Sunday 12:00pm. Champions is Talent show that provides a platform for physically challenged artists and performers to Show Their Talent. The show is hosted by Thejeswari. Pattimandram Raja and Revathi are the judges. The success of the show is evidenced by its remakes in 2 other regional languages. The show last aired on 16 February 2014 and ended with 14 episodes.

External links
 Official Website 
 Sun TV on YouTube
 Sun TV Network 
 Sun Group 

Sun TV original programming
2013 Tamil-language television series debuts
Tamil-language reality television series
Tamil-language television shows
2014 Tamil-language television series endings